Aberthaw Lime Works is a derelict structure, located on the South Wales coast, between Fontygary Bay and Aberthaw Power Station. The structure is a Grade II Listed Building. The structure is considered a listed building because it is a well preserved structure from an important regional industry. 
 
The Aberthaw Lime Works was opened on 22 December 1888, by the Aberthaw Pebble Limestone Company.  It was built to utilise the huge number of Limestone Pebbles that had previously been taken inland or been moved by boat. The Lime Works operated until 1926. The Lime works brought a new scale of working to the lime industry which was really just a cottage industry in the area previously. 

The local limestone and brick structure is still largely intact, although it is missing most of its wooden components. It contains 2 vertical pot draw kilns each holding up to 300 tons each, which could produce up to 40 tons of burnt lime a day.  Next to the main structure, there are 2 pot kilns which are also largely intact. These Kilns were built later than the main structure, but also ceased operation in 1926.

The lime works were originally served by a tramway, which ran from the direction of Rhoose (east of the lime works). It passed either side of the now demolished winch house. A tramway ramp (again demolished) allowed carts containing pebbles between 3 &  in diameter to be conveyed to the top of the works and then into the kilns.

Aberthaw Lime 
Aberthaw Lime is well known for being Hydraulic lime.  a 1 to 1 mixture of Aberthaw Lime and Pozzolana was reported to be considered for the construction of the Eddystone Lighthouse. However, it would seem that although he tested using Aberthaw Lime, John Smeaton actually used lime from Watchet. It was the subject of an important series of experiments in 1756-7 undertaken by John Smeaton to test the setting qualities of lime in sea water preparatory to designing and building the Eddystone lighthouse. The fame it got from its use at the Eddystone and other lighthouses naturally led to increased demand which could not be fully met until this major new works was built. The arrival of the railway enabled it to be properly serviced with the necessary coal for firing, as well as the ability to transport the lime away.

Architecture of Aberthaw Lime Works 
Interior
Kilns lined with firebrick, with stone lined tunnels and iron doors.

Exterior
Coursed quarry faced local limestone rubble with red brick quoins. Tall (about 20m) battered walls with two semi-circular openings on the west side and charge holes on top. A pair of very large and massively built lime kilns, which brought a new scale of working to the lime burning industry, being able to burn 300 tons of limestone at a time. The kilns were charged automatically via a tramway and a tipping device, which brought waggon loads of lime and coal directly to the charge holes on the top.

See also 
Aberthaw
Aberthaw Cement Works

References

External links 
 The Lime Works on Google Maps

Buildings and structures in the Vale of Glamorgan
Lime kilns in Wales